Eoconus diversiformis is an extinct species of sea snail, a marine gastropod mollusk, in the family Conidae.

Description
The length of the shell attains 42 mm

Distribution
Fossils of this species were found in the Paris Basin, France

References

 Deshayes, G. P. "GP 1835-1845." Histoire naturelle des animaux sans vertèbres 1 (1835): 11.
 Tracey S., Craig B., Belliard L. & Gain O. (2017). One, four or forty species? - early Conidae (Mollusca, Gastropoda) that led to a radiation and biodiversity peak in the late Lutetian Eocene of the Cotentin, NW France. Carnets de Voyages Paléontologiques dans le Bassin Anglo-Parisien. 3: 1-38

External links
 Worldwide Mollusc Species Data Base: Conus diversiformis

diversiformis
Gastropods described in 1835